C. purpureum may refer to:
 Chlorogalum purpureum, the purple amole, a flowering plant species endemic to California
 Chondrostereum purpureum, the silver leaf, a fungus plant pathogen species

See also 
 Purpureum (disambiguation)